Four Lakes is an unincorporated community and census-designated place in Spokane County, Washington, United States, just southwest of the city of Spokane, and north of Cheney. As of the 2010 census, its population was 512. Both Interstate 90 and SR 904 run through Four Lakes and the junction of the two is located near the center of town.  Four Lakes was founded in 1879 by G.H. Morgan. The community was so named on account of there being four lakes near the original town site.  It is speculated the fourth lake, is now a marsh south of Meadow Lake, which was drained by the ditch, blasted through basalt, which Minnie Creek flows through, under SR 904, south of the rodeo grounds.

Economy
Largely because Four Lakes is a bedroom community for its neighbors such as Cheney and Spokane, there are very few businesses . A hair salon, a tavern, a dog grooming business, and a convenience store are among the small handful of businesses that call Four Lakes home. Most of the businesses in Four Lakes have been located there for many years and are firmly rooted. Farms are also plentiful around Four Lakes. The small community has its own post office, water district, and volunteer fire department.

Schools
A school for first through eighth grade students operated in Four Lakes from 1917 to 1959, when it merged into the Cheney School District. Most elementary students in Four Lakes now attend Betz Elementary, while older students attend either Cheney High School or Cheney Middle School. A very small fraction of high school-age students may attend Three Springs High School in Cheney.

The Battle of Four Lakes

Climate
This climatic region is typified by large seasonal temperature differences, with warm to hot (and often humid) summers and cold (sometimes severely cold) winters.  According to the Köppen Climate Classification system, Four Lakes has a humid continental climate, abbreviated "Dfb" on climate maps.

References

Heather's Canine Cuts

Census-designated places in Spokane County, Washington
Census-designated places in Washington (state)